Büzmeýin District  (from 2002 to 2018 called Abadan District, expanded in 2018 to include former Archabil District and Chandybil District) is a borough of Ashgabat, Turkmenistan.  As a borough, it is headed by a presidentially appointed mayor. The borough known as Büzmeýin should not be confused with the neighborhood of the same name in Ashgabat, boundaries of which correspond to the former city of Büzmeýin/Abadan.

Boundaries of Büzmeýin District on OpenStreetMap

History 
In 2018, Abadan District of the  city of Ashgabat was renamed Büzmeýin District.

See also
Ashgabat
Büzmeýin, Turkmenistan
Districts of Turkmenistan

References

Ashgabat
Districts of Turkmenistan